The 442 class are a class of diesel locomotives built by AE Goodwin and Comeng, Auburn for the New South Wales Department of Railways between 1970 and 1973.

History

The 442 class were ordered and operated by the New South Wales Government Railways. They were the second generation of Alco units to be built, and were used on both main freight and passenger service in New South Wales. Since entering private ownership they have operated across Australia. They are identical to the South Australian Railways 700 class. They were nicknamed Jumbos, due to their 1971 delivery coinciding with that of Qantas' first Boeing 747s.

Construction
The 442 class were built from 1971 to replace the 40 class locomotives dating from 1951, as they could not be economically rebuilt to modern standards. Twenty locomotives were initially ordered from AE Goodwin, the contract stipulating that the 40 class be accepted as a trade in, with some parts from the older units used for the new locomotives. The contract was later extended by 20 units.

The first locomotive was completed in October 1970 but was rejected due to rough riding concerns in testing, with five months passing before it was finally accepted after modifications to the bogie design. 

After AE Goodwin was placed in administration it was sold to Comeng who completed the last six locomotives with a Mitsubishi alternator in lieu of a generator.

In service
The 442 class operated mainline services across the state. In 1985, some (including 23-27, 29 & 30) were fitted with V/Line radios to allow them to operate services through to Melbourne. This ceased in 1987 with those fitted being sent to Melbourne to have the equipment removed.

By the end of their careers, all were based at Broadmeadow Locomotive Depot and mainly operated on the North Coast and Main North lines.

Disposal
Following the delivery of new 82 and 90 class locomotives most were withdrawn in 1994. In December 1994, nineteen were sold at auction:

4 to Silverton Rail all returned to traffic, 
2 to Austrac Ready Power leased to BHP, Port Kembla
1 to Australian National with the intention of using as a source of spares to repair fire damaged 702 but the plan was cancelled and both scrapped
12 to Morrison Knudsen Australia who intended to rebuild these locomotives to haul roadrailer trains. It was planned to remove the Alco prime mover and generator, and replace it with a rebuilt EMD 645F 16 cylinder engine mated to an AR10 alternator. To allow this the locomotive frame would be cut in half and a new section 1.5 metres long welded into the middle to lengthen it, and the number 2 end cab would be blanked off, making the locomotive single ended. Preliminary work was carried out for the project before it was cancelled in mid 1995 with 10 of the locomotives scrapped at Morrison Knudsen’s Whyalla plant, but some parts were later used in the RL class project. Two were sold to Silverton Rail and entered service in 1998/99.

A locomotive shortage saw six reinstated by FreightCorp in late 1995. After being used as shunters in Sydney, the last were withdrawn in March 1998. One of these (44211) was earmarked for preservation and placed in the care of the New South Wales Rail Transport Museum.

Rebirth as JL and GL classes
In preparation for the sale of FreightCorp, the remaining locomotives were sold to Great Northern Rail Services, Victoria in 2001. Five were overhauled and returned to service as the JL class. All were sold to Chicago Freight Car Leasing Australia, who contracted UGL Rail, Broadmeadow to remanufacture 12 units with refurbished General Electric C30-7A components recovered from withdrawn Conrail locomotives. They were reclassified as the GL class with all completed between June 2003 and October 2004.

This involved the locomotives being stripped to the bare chassis and remanufactured from the ground up, the only equipment retained being the bogies, main frames and fuel tanks. The original Alco 12-251C engines and AEI generators were replaced with fully overhauled GE 7FDL-12 engines and alternators. 
New cabs with desk-top controls and improved collision protection and bodies that retained a dual-cab configuration were fitted. The JLs have since resumed their original numbers with two sold to Southern Shorthaul Railroad.

The GLs have been leased to a variety of operators including Bowmans Rail, El Zorro, Freight Australia, Freightliner, GrainCorp, Independent Rail of Australia, Pacific National, Aurizon and Qube Logistics. Two were repainted in Freightliner livery in 2010, the remainder have remained in CFCLA's silver and blue livery.

Fleet status
Some of the locomotives were named after race horses, as shown in the Name column.

References

External links

A. E. Goodwin locomotives
Co-Co locomotives
Commonwealth Engineering locomotives
Diesel locomotives of New South Wales
Railway locomotives introduced in 1971
Standard gauge locomotives of Australia
Diesel-electric locomotives of Australia